Brynley John Parry (11 January 1924 – 20 January 2010) was a Welsh professional footballer. During his career he made almost 100 appearances for Swansea Town and 138 appearances for Ipswich Town between 1951 and 1955. Born in Wales in 1924, Jack married Edith and had 3 children. In his later years he moved to London and then Chelmsford as a bricklayer. Most notably, Parry 'topped off' the Natwest building in London. Parry had 6 grandchildren and 2 great grandchildren all living around the Chelmsford area of Essex before his death in 2010.

References

External links
Jack Parry at Pride of Anglia

1924 births
2010 deaths
Association football goalkeepers
Ipswich Town F.C. players
People from Pontardawe
Sportspeople from Neath Port Talbot
Swansea City A.F.C. players
Wales international footballers
Welsh footballers
Chelmsford City F.C. players